Robert Prevost may refer to:

 Robert Prévost (1927–1982), Canadian set designer
 Robert Francis Prevost (born 1955), American Catholic prelate